Ádám Madaras (born 28 December 1966) is a Hungarian World and European champion modern pentathlete, fencer, actor, stuntman, media entrepreneur. He participated on the Hungarian team which won a gold medal at the 1991 World Modern Pentathlon Championships in San Antonio. Ádám Madaras also won the Hungarian National Championships in the épée fencing event in 1990. He is 9-time Hungarian champion in modern pentathlon.

Awards
Madaras was elected Hungarian Pentathlete of the Year in 1991.

Filmography
A Hídember (2002) as the adjutant of Karl Clam-Martinitz

References

1966 births
Living people
Hungarian male modern pentathletes
World Modern Pentathlon Championships medalists
Sportspeople from Budapest